Andrew Marc Weiner OSA NAE NAI (Born July 25, 1958) is an American electrical engineer, educator and researcher known for contributions to the fields of ultrafast optics and optical signal processing. He is the Scifres Family Distinguished Professor of Electrical and Computer Engineering at Purdue University.

Career 
Weiner received a Sc.D. in electrical engineering in 1984 from the Massachusetts Institute of Technology. Following graduation he joined Bellcore, then a premier telecommunications research and development company, eventually serving as Manager of Ultrafast Optics and Optical Signal Processing Research. In 1992, Weiner was appointed at professor rank at the School of Electrical and Computer Engineering at Purdue University.

Weiner’s research in ultrafast optics focuses on the processing of extremely high-speed lightwave signals as well as their application to the generation and manipulation of ultrabroadband radio-frequency signals. He is most well-known for research on the development of Fourier synthesis methods for controlling the shape of femtosecond light pulses. These methods extend femtosecond pulse generation technology by providing the ability to engineer these pulses into complex phase- and amplitude-modulated ultrafast optical waveforms according to specification. Findings from Weiner’s research have been applied in fiber optic networks and in ultrafast optical science laboratories around the world. Specific studies in recent years address quantum photonics, Kerr comb generation in on-chip microresonators, and microwave and millimeter wave photonics. Weiner authored the textbook Ultrafast Optics (Wiley, 2009), and served as editor in chief of Optics Express, the largest journal broadly covering optics and photonics, from 2013 to 2018.

Awards and honors 
In 2008, Weiner was elected to the U.S. National Academy of Engineering, “for contributions to the development of femtosecond optical-pulse shaping technology.” He is a Fellow of the National Academy of Inventors (2016), the Optical Society of America (1990) and the Institute of Electrical and Electronics Engineers (IEEE) (1995). He received a National Security Science and Engineering Fellowship, now called the Vannevar Bush Faculty Fellowship, from the U.S. Department of Defense in 2009. He has received the Optical Society of America’s Adolph Lomb Medal (1990) in recognition of his early career achievements, the International Commission for Optics Prize (1997), the Alexander von Humboldt Foundation Research Award for Senior U.S. Scientists (2000), as well as the IEEE Photonics Society’s Quantum Electronics Award (2011). Weiner is the co-recipient (with Jonathan Heritage) of both the Optical Society of America’s R. W. Wood Prize (2008) and the IEEE Photonics Society’s William Streifer Scientific Achievement Award (1999). He was also recognized by Popular Science Magazine for one of the "Top 100 Inventions of 1988" for the 100-femtosecond all-optical switch.

Weiner has received numerous awards from Purdue University. He was awarded the Herbert Newby McCoy Award (2013), which is the most prestigious award given by the university in natural sciences. He is also the inaugural recipient of the College of Engineering’s Research Award (2003). In recognition of his mentorship, Weiner received the Purdue University Provost’s Award for Outstanding Graduate Mentor (2008) and the College of Engineering Mentorship Award (2014).

Weiner was a Hertz Fellow at MIT and a recipient of the Hertz Foundation Doctoral Thesis Prize.

In addition to his technical interests, Weiner has had a lifelong interest in martial arts, and holds black belt rank in Aikido and Judo.

Publications

References

External links

Andrew M. Weiner Purdue University Website

Living people
American electrical engineers
MIT School of Engineering alumni
Purdue University faculty
Members of the United States National Academy of Engineering
Fellow Members of the IEEE
Fellows of Optica (society)
Electrical engineering academics
Academic journal editors
20th-century American engineers
21st-century American engineers
1958 births